Wispin is an iOS game developed by Grumpyface Studios and released on November 18, 2010.

Critical reception

The game received "generally favorable reviews" according to the review aggregation website Metacritic.

References

2010 video games
Action video games
Grumpyface Studios games
IOS games
IOS-only games
Single-player video games
Video games developed in the United States